The following is a timeline of the history of the city of Le Mans, France.

Prior to 18th century

 4th C. - Julian of Le Mans becomes bishop.
 5th C. – Roman Catholic Diocese of Le Mans established.
 6th C. – Le Mans Cathedral rebuilding begins.
 832 – Aldric of Le Mans becomes bishop.
 1063 – William the Conqueror in power.
 1120 – Le Mans Cathedral consecrated.
 1133 – 5 March: Birth of Henry (later king of England).
 1189 – Philip II of France in power.
 1508 – Maine customary laws published.
 1558 –  built.
 1562 – Le Mans sacked by Huguenots.

18th–19th centuries
 1756 – Town Hall built.
 1760 – Prefecture built.
 1790 – Le Mans becomes part of the Sarthe souveraineté.
 1793
 December: Battle of Le Mans (1793).
 Population: 18,855.
 1799 – Royalist Chouans take Le Mans.
 1812 – Nouvelliste de la Sarthe newspaper begins publication.
 1854 – Gare du Mans (rail station) opens.
 1856 –  established.
 1857 - Notre Dame de Sainte Croix completed.
 1866 – Population: 45,230.
 1868 – La Sarthe newspaper begins publication.
 1871 – January: Battle of Le Mans; Germans win.
 1873 – Comptoir d'Escompte de la Sarthe (bank) established.
 1875 –  founded.
 1880 – Société philotechnique du Maine active.
 1886 – Petit Manceau newspaper begins publication.
 1888 –  (rail station) opens.

20th century

 1906 
 Automobile Club de l'Ouest founded.
 Population: 54,907.
 1908 – August: Wright brothers demonstrate flying machine.
 1911 – Population: 69,361.
 1923– First edition of the 24 Hours of Le Mans auto race.
 1936 – Population: 84,525.
 1940 – 19 June: German forces take city, during the Battle of France.
 1944
 8 August: Germans ousted by Allied forces, during the Battle of Normandy.
 Le Maine Libre newspaper begins publication.
 1946 – Population: 100,455.
 1947 –  becomes mayor.
 1965 –  becomes mayor.
 1967
 Cantons Centre, Est, Nord, Nord-Ouest, Sud, and  created.
 Le Mans twinned with Paderborn, Germany.
 1974 – Le Mans twinned with Bolton, England, United Kingdom.
 1977
 Le Mans University opens.
 Robert Jarry becomes mayor.
 1981 – Le Mans twinned with Rostov-on-Don, Russia.
 1982
 Le Mans becomes part of the Pays de la Loire region.
 Le Mans twinned with Haouza, Western Sahara.
 1983 – Le Mans twinned with Volos, Greece.
 1985 Le Mans FC founded.
 1989 –  opens.
 1990 – Le Mans twinned with Suzuka, Japan.
 1999 – Population: 146,105.

21st century

 2001
  ice rink opens.
 Jean-Claude Boulard becomes mayor.
 2002 –  (circus) begins.
 2005 – November: Socialist Party national congress held in Le Mans.
 2006 – 9 March: Sablé-sur-Sarthe hostage crisis occurs near Le Mans.
 2007 – Le Mans tramway begins operating.
 2010 – Roman-era religious site discovered in nearby Neuville-sur-Sarthe.
 2011 – Population: 143,240.
 2014 – March:  held.
 2015 – December:  held.

See also
 Le Mans history
 
 
 
 List of bishops of Le Mans
  history
 List of Counts and dukes of Maine, 8th–18th c., centered in Le Mans

other cities in the Pays de la Loire region
 Timeline of Angers
 Timeline of Nantes

References

This article incorporates information from the French Wikipedia.

Bibliography

in English

in French

External links

 Items related to Le Mans, various dates (via Europeana).
 Items related to Le Mans, various dates (via Digital Public Library of America).

mans
Le Mans
mans